Monument to Yuri Gagarin is a 42.5-meter high pedestal and statue of Yuri Gagarin, the first person to travel in space. It is located at Leninsky Prospekt in Moscow. The pedestal is designed to be reminiscent of a rocket exhaust. The statue is made of titanium, a metal often used in spacecraft, and weighs 12 tons.

Description
The monument to Yuri Gagarin was built for the 1980 Olympic Games. It stands in Gagarin Square on Leninsky Avenue. The creators of the monument are the sculptor Pavel Bondarenko, architects Yakov Belopolsky, F.M. Gazhevsky, and designer A.F. Sudakov. The monument is made of titanium and mounted on a high ribbed pedestal. At the foot of the monument is a copy of the Vostok descent vehicle, which was flown on April 12, 1961, when Yuri Gagarin made the first crewed flight into space.

The statue creators turned to the specialists at the All-Russian Institute Of Aviation Materials (VIAM) for help, who recommended the sculpture use the titanium casting alloy VT5L, which has a shiny surface and acceptable color. In addition, specialists at VIAM developed technical processes used by VSMPO to cast ingots of VT5L alloy with a low oxygen content (0.12%).

The monument was made in less than a year at the Balashikha Foundry and Mechanical Plant. The titanium sculpture of Yuri Gagarin was assembled from 238 cast segments, which were connected with bolts and welding. The greatest problems arose with the manufacture of the largest segment – the cosmonaut's face. The Monument to Yuri Gagarin is the world's first large-scale monument made of titanium.

The figure of Gagarin is facing upward. The high ribbed pedestal is an important part of the composition and symbolizes the launch of the space rocket. The inscription at the base of the monument reads (in Russian):

Commemorative coin

The monument to Yuri Gagarin is depicted on the reverse side of a non-circulating 1 oz silver 3 rouble coin. This coin was minted in 1991 to honor the 30th anniversary of human spaceflight.  An image of the monument is depicted on the back side of the coin, along with the words (in Russian) "30 years of human spaceflight".

See also
 Statue of Yuri Gagarin, Greenwich
 Monument to the Conquerors of Space

References

External links

Metal sculptures
Monuments and memorials to Yuri Gagarin
Monuments and memorials in Moscow
Sculptures of men in Russia
Statues in Russia
Cultural heritage monuments in Moscow